The 2010–11 NBB Cup was the 43rd season of the Dutch NBB Cup. The championship game was played in the Topsportcentrum in Almere. GasTerra Flames won the cup, its second title ever and first one since 2005. The WCAA Giants were the runners-up after appearing in their first cup final.

Fourth round

|}

Quarterfinals

|}

Final Four

Bracket

References

NBB Cup
NBB Cup